Güngör may refer to:

Given name
 Yekta Güngör Özden (born 1932), Turkish judge, and former president of the Constitutional Court of Turkey

Surname
 Adnan Güngör (born 1980), Turkish footballer
 Aslı Güngör (born 1979), Turkish pop-folk singer and songwriter
 Buse Güngör (born 1994), Turkish women's footballer
 Bülent Güngör, Turkish architect
 Çetin Güngör (born 1990), Turkish footballer
 Emre Güngör (born 1984), Turkish footballer
 Eren Güngör (born 1988), Turkish footballer
 Erol Güngör (1938–1983), Turkish sociologist, psychologist, and writer
 Hasan Güngör (1934–2011), Turkish Olympic medalist sports wrestler
 Leyla Güngör (born 1993), Turkish-Swedish women's footballer
 Michael Gungor (born 1980), American musician singer/songwriter
 Mine Güngör (born 1983), Turkish women's ice hockey player
 Mustafa Güngör (born 1981), German international rugby union player
 Zerrin Güngör (born 1955),  president of the Turkish Council of State

See also
 Koutsoventis

Turkish-language surnames